The 2020 KBS Entertainment Awards presented by Korean Broadcasting System (KBS), took place on December 24, 2020 at KBS New Wing Open Hall in Yeouido-dong, Yeongdeungpo-gu, Seoul. It was hosted by Jun Hyun-moo, Jin Se-yeon and Kim Jun-hyun.

Nominations and winners

Presenters

Special performances

See also 
 2020 MBC Entertainment Awards
 2020 SBS Entertainment Awards

References

External links 
  
 

Korean Broadcasting System original programming
KBS Entertainment Awards
2020 television awards
2020 in South Korea